The list of shipwrecks in 1923 includes ships sunk, foundered, grounded, or otherwise lost during 1923.

January

February

March

April

May

June

July

August

September

October

1 October

2 October

3 October

4 October

7 October

8 October

9 October

10 October

11 October

12 October

13 October

14 October

15 October

16 October

17 October

18 October

19 October

20 October

21 October

22 October

23 October

24 October

25 October

27 October

29 October

31 October

Unknown date

November

1 November

2 November

3 November

4 November

5 November

6 November

7 November

9 November

10 November

11 November

12 November

13 November

15 November

17 November

18 November

21 November

23 November

24 November

26 November

27 November

29 November

30 November

December

1 December

3 December

5 December

6 December

7 December

9 December

10 December

11 December

13 December

15 December

16 December

17 December

18 December

19 December

20 December

22 December

25 December

26 December

27 December

28 December

29 December

30 December

31 December

Unknown date

Unknown date

References 

 
1923
Ships